Jesús Hernández may refer to:

 Jesús Hernández (cyclist) (born 1981), Spanish road bicycle racer
 Jesús Hernández (footballer, born 1993), Venezuelan footballer
 Jesús Hernández (footballer, born 2001), Venezuelan footballer
 Jesús Hernández (footballer, born 2004), Mexican footballer
 Jesus Hernandez (racing driver) (born 1981), developmental driver for Earnhardt Ganassi Racing
 Jesús Hernández Hernández (born 1991), Mexican Paralympic swimmer
 Jesús Hernández Tomás (1907–1971), Spanish communist leader during the Spanish Civil War
 Jesús Hernández Úbeda (1959–1996), Spanish cyclist
 Jesús Daniel Hernández (born 2001), Mexican footballer
 Jesús Fernández Hernández (born 1975), Spanish basketball player
 Jesús Sanoja Hernández (1930–2007), Venezuelan journalist, historian and writer